Crematogaster clariventris is a species of ant in tribe Crematogastrini. It was described by Mayr in 1895.

References

clariventris
Insects described in 1895